Croton Canyon is a valley in Kane County, Utah, United States.

The valley may have taken its name from a native pant such as croton tiglium.

References

Canyons and gorges of Utah
Landforms of Kane County, Utah